Dmytro Bondarenko (born 9 August 1936) is a Ukrainian athlete. He competed in the men's long jump at the 1956 Summer Olympics and the 1960 Summer Olympics, representing the Soviet Union.

References

External links
 

1936 births
Living people
Athletes (track and field) at the 1956 Summer Olympics
Athletes (track and field) at the 1960 Summer Olympics
Ukrainian male long jumpers
Soviet male long jumpers
Olympic athletes of the Soviet Union
Place of birth missing (living people)